Back Home is the seventeenth solo studio album by Eric Clapton. It was released 29 August 2005 internationally and a day later in the U.S. It is his first album containing new, original material since Reptile (2001), as the previous release Me and Mr. Johnson is an album of song covers of Robert Johnson.

"Say What You Will" is a song that Clapton offered to the Japanese musical group SMAP.

Critical reception

Back Home was met with "mixed or average" reviews from critics. At Metacritic, which assigns a weighted average rating out of 100 to reviews from mainstream publications, this release received an average score of 52 based on 10 reviews.

Track listing
 "So Tired" (Eric Clapton, Simon Climie) – 4:47
 "Say What You Will" (Clapton, Climie) – 4:35
 "I'm Going Left" (Stevie Wonder, Syreeta Wright) – 4:03
 "Love Don't Love Nobody" (Joseph Jefferson, Charles Simmons) – 7:13
 "Revolution" (Clapton, Climie) – 5:00
 "Love Comes to Everyone" (George Harrison) – 4:35
 "Lost and Found" (Doyle Bramhall II, Jeremy Stacey) – 5:21
 "Piece of My Heart" (Bramhall II, Susannah Melvoin, Mike Elizondo) – 4:22
 "One Day" (Vince Gill, Beverly Darnall) – 5:20
 "One Track Mind" (Clapton, Climie) – 5:04
 "Run Home to Me" (Clapton, Climie) – 6:18
 "Back Home" (Clapton) – 3:33

DualDisc version
The special edition DualDisc format of the album features the whole album in surround sound, an interview with Clapton, and five selections from the album played live in the studio. This special package also featured four exclusive guitar picks which display "Back Home" and Clapton's signature on them. The picks came in violet, blue, red and grey.

Personnel 

 Eric Clapton – lead vocals, guitar
 Doyle Bramhall II – guitar
 Andy Fairweather-Low – baritone guitar
 Vince Gill – guitar 
 John Mayer – guitar
 Robert Randolph – pedal steel guitar
 Simon Climie – keyboards, programming
 Toby Baker – keyboards
 Billy Preston – keyboards, acoustic piano, Hammond organ
 Chris Stainton – keyboards
 Steve Winwood – keyboards
 Nathan East – bass guitar
 Paul Fakhourie – bass guitar
 Pino Palladino – bass guitar
 Steve Gadd – drums
 Abe Laboriel Jr. – drums
 Nicky Shaw – programming, percussion
 Kick Horns – brass
 Gavyn Wright – violin
 Isobel Griffiths – strings
 Nick Ingman – strings
 Michelle John – backing vocals
 Sharon White – backing vocals
 Lawrence Johnson – backing vocals

Production 

 Eric Clapton – producer, cover design concept, liner notes
 Simon Climie – producer, Pro Tools engineer
 Alan Douglas – recording engineer
 Bea Henkel – second assistant engineer
 George Renwick – assistant engineer
 Phillippe Rose – assistant engineer
 Mick Guzauski – mix engineer
 Tom Bender – mix assistant
 Joel Evendeen – assistant Pro Tools
 Jonathan Shakhovskoy – assistant Pro Tools
 Bob Ludwig – mastering at Gateway Mastering (Portland, ME).
 Lee Dickson – guitar technician
 Debbie Johnson – session coordinator (Los Angeles).
 Bushbranch – management
 Catherine Roylance – art direction and design
 Paul Higgens – illustration
 Chris Sykes – main photography
 Allan Titmuss – photography
 Jill Furmanovsky – photography
 Dunlop Management, Inc. – pick pack concept

Awards
Alan Douglas and Mick Guzauski (engineer) won the 2006 Grammy Award for Best Engineered Album, Non-Classical for the album.

George Harrison tribute
Back Home was Clapton's first studio album released after the death of his close friend George Harrison in November 2001. Clapton covered Harrison's song "Love Comes to Everyone" from his 1979 self-titled album as tribute. Clapton had played the guitar introduction on the original version. In Japan during the tour of George Harrison with Eric Clapton and his band, the song was played but only once, the first night (1 December 1991, Yokohama Arena).

Charts

Weekly charts

Year-end charts

Certifications

References

Eric Clapton albums
2005 albums
Reprise Records albums
Albums produced by Simon Climie
Albums recorded at Olympic Sound Studios
Grammy Award for Best Engineered Album, Non-Classical